Ocean Cay is an island in the Bahamas located in the district of Bimini. It is located 20 miles (32 kilometers) south of Bimini proper. Ocean Cay is an artificial island which was built by dredging in the late 1960s by Dillingham Corporation of Hawaii  and was used to mine Aragonite sand for diverse industrial purposes. [sand mining] The cay has been redeveloped as a private island called Ocean Cay MSC Marine Reserve for MSC Cruises.

References

Artificial islands
Private islands of the Bahamas
MSC Cruises